The Indian state of Andhra Pradesh has 557 bird species within its political boundary. The latest update follows the conventions of the IOC World Bird List, version 11.2, published in 2021. The rose-ringed parakeet is the state bird of Andhra Pradesh.

The following tags have been used to highlight several categories. The commonly occurring native species do not fit within any of these categories.

(A) Accidental - Also known as a rarity, it refers to a species that rarely or accidentally occurs in Andhra Pradesh-typically less than ten confirmed records.

Ducks, geese, and swans

Order: AnseriformesFamily: Anatidae

Anatidae includes the ducks and most duck-like waterfowl, such as geese and swans. These birds are adapted to an aquatic existence with webbed feet, flattened bills, and feathers that are excellent at shedding water due to an oily coating.

Fulvous whistling duck, Dendrocygna bicolor
Lesser whistling duck, Dendrocygna javanica
Bar-headed goose, Anser indicus
Knob-billed duck, Sarkidiornis melanotos
Common shelduck, Tadorna tadorna
Ruddy shelduck, Tadorna ferruginea
Cotton pygmy goose, Nettapus coromandelianus
Garganey, Spatula querquedula
Northern shoveler, Spatula clypeata
Gadwall, Mareca strepera
Eurasian wigeon, Mareca penelope
Indian spot-billed duck, Anas poecilorhyncha
Mallard, Anas platyrhynchos
Northern pintail, Anas acuta
Eurasian teal, Anas crecca
Red-crested pochard, Netta rufina
Common pochard, Aythya ferina
Ferruginous duck, Aythya nyroca
Tufted duck, Aythya fuligula
Greater scaup, Aythya marila

Pheasants and allies

Order: GalliformesFamily: Phasianidae

The Phasianidae are a family of terrestrial birds which consists of quails, partridges, snowcocks, francolins, spurfowls, tragopans, monals, pheasants, peafowls and jungle fowls. In general, they are plump (although they vary in size) and have broad, relatively short wings.

Painted francolin, Francolinus pictus
Grey francolin, Francolinus pondicerianus
Common quail, Coturnix coturnix
Rain quail, Coturnix coromandelica
King quail, Excalfactoria chinensis
Jungle bush quail, Perdicula asiatica
Rock bush quail, Perdicula argoondah
Painted bush quail, Perdicula erythrorhyncha
Red spurfowl, Galloperdix spadicea
Painted spurfowl, Galloperdix lunulata
Red junglefowl, Gallus gallus
Grey junglefowl, Gallus sonneratii
Indian peafowl, Pavo cristatus

Nightjars

Order: CaprimulgiformesFamily: Caprimulgidae

Nightjars are medium-sized nocturnal birds that usually nest on the ground. They have long wings, short legs and very short bills. Most have small feet, of little use for walking, and long pointed wings. Their soft plumage is camouflaged to resemble bark or leaves.

Jungle nightjar, Caprimulgus indicus
Grey nightjar, Caprimulgus jotaka
Jerdon's nightjar, Caprimulgus atripennis
Large-tailed nightjar, Caprimulgus macrurus
Indian nightjar, Caprimulgus asiaticus
Savanna nightjar, Caprimulgus affinis

Treeswifts

Order: ApodiformesFamily: Hemiprocnidae

The treeswifts, also called crested swifts, are closely related to the true swifts. They differ from the other swifts in that they have crests, long forked tails and softer plumage.

Crested treeswift, Hemiprocne coronata

Swifts
Order: ApodiformesFamily: Apodidae

Swifts are small birds which spend the majority of their lives flying. These birds have very short legs and never settle voluntarily on the ground, perching instead only on vertical surfaces. Many swifts have long swept-back wings which resemble a crescent or boomerang.

White-rumped spinetail, Zoonavena sylvatica 
Brown-backed needletail, Hirundapus giganteus
Asian palm swift, Cypsiurus balasiensis
Alpine swift, Tachymarptis melba
Common swift, Apus apus
Blyth's swift, Apus leuconyx
Little swift, Apus affinis

Bustards

Order: OtidiformesFamily: Otididae

Bustards are large terrestrial birds mainly associated with dry open country and steppes in the Old World. They are omnivorous and nest on the ground. They walk steadily on strong legs and big toes, pecking for food as they go. They have long broad wings with "fingered" wingtips and striking patterns in flight. Many have interesting mating displays.

Great Indian bustard, Ardeotis nigriceps
Lesser florican, Sypheotides indicus

Cuckoos

Order: CuculiformesFamily: Cuculidae

The family Cuculidae includes cuckoos, roadrunners and anis. These birds are of variable size with slender bodies, long tails and strong legs. Many are brood parasites.

Greater coucal, Centropus sinensis
Sirkeer malkoha, Taccocua leschenaultii
Blue-faced malkoha, Phaenicophaeus viridirostris
Green-billed malkoha, Phaenicophaeus tristis
Chestnut-winged cuckoo, Clamator coromandus
Jacobin cuckoo, Clamator jacobinus
Asian koel, Eudynamys scolopaceus
Asian emerald cuckoo, Chrysococcyx maculatus
Banded bay cuckoo, Cacomantis sonneratii
Plaintive cuckoo, Cacomantis merulinus
Grey-bellied cuckoo, Cacomantis passerinus
Fork-tailed drongo-cuckoo, Surniculus dicruroides
Large hawk-cuckoo, Hierococcyx sparverioides
Common hawk-cuckoo, Hierococcyx varius
Lesser cuckoo, Cuculus poliocephalus
Indian cuckoo, Cuculus micropterus
Common cuckoo, Cuculus canorus

Sandgrouse

Order: PterocliformesFamily: Pteroclidae

Sandgrouse have small, pigeon like heads and necks, but sturdy compact bodies. They have long pointed wings and sometimes tails and a fast direct flight. Flocks fly to watering holes at dawn and dusk. Their legs are feathered down to the toes.

Chestnut-bellied sandgrouse, Pterocles exustus
Painted sandgrouse, Pterocles indicus

Pigeons and doves

Order: ColumbiformesFamily: Columbidae

Pigeons and doves are stout-bodied birds with short necks and short slender bills with a fleshy cere.

Rock dove, Columba livia
Nilgiri wood pigeon, Columba elphinstonii
Pale-capped pigeon, Columba punicea
Oriental turtle dove, Streptopelia orientalis
Eurasian collared dove, Streptopelia decaocto
Red collared dove, Streptopelia tranquebarica
Spotted dove, Spilopelia chinensis
Laughing dove, Spilopelia senegalensis
Common emerald dove, Chalcophaps indica
Orange-breasted green pigeon, Treron bicinctus
Grey-fronted green pigeon, Treron affinis
Thick-billed green pigeon, Treron curvirostra
Yellow-footed green pigeon, Treron phoenicopterus
Green imperial pigeon, Ducula aenea

Rails, crakes, and coots

Order: GruiformesFamily: Rallidae

Rallidae is a large family of small to medium-sized birds which includes the rails, crakes, coots and gallinules. Typically they inhabit dense vegetation in damp environments near lakes, swamps or rivers. In general they are shy and secretive birds, making them difficult to observe. Most species have strong legs and long toes which are well adapted to soft uneven surfaces. They tend to have short, rounded wings and to be weak fliers.

Water rail, Rallus indicus
Slaty-breasted rail, Lewinia striata
Spotted crake, Porzana porzana
Common moorhen, Gallinula chloropus
Eurasian coot, Fulica atra
Grey-headed swamphen, Porphyrio poliocephalus
Ruddy-breasted crake, Zapornia fusca
Brown crake, Zapornia akool
Baillon's crake, Zapornia pusilla
Little crake, Zapornia parva
Slaty-legged crake, Rallina eurizonoides
Watercock, Gallicrex cinerea
White-breasted waterhen, Amaurornis phoenicurus

Cranes

Order: GruiformesFamily: Gruidae

Cranes are large, long-legged and long-necked birds. Unlike the similar-looking but unrelated herons, cranes fly with necks outstretched, not pulled back. Most have elaborate and noisy courting displays or "dances".

Sarus crane, Antigone antigone 
Demoiselle crane, Anthropoides virgo
Common crane, Grus grus

Grebes

Order: PodicipediformesFamily: Podicipedidae

Grebes are small to medium-large freshwater diving birds. They have lobed toes and are excellent swimmers and divers. However, they have their feet placed far back on the body, making them quite ungainly on land.

Little grebe, Tachybaptus ruficollis
Great crested grebe, Podiceps cristatus

Flamingos

Order: PhoenicopteriformesFamily: Phoenicopteridae

Flamingos filter-feed on shellfish and algae. Their oddly shaped beaks are specially adapted to separate mud and silt from the food they consume and, uniquely, are used upside-down.

Greater flamingo, Phoenicopterus roseus
Lesser flamingo, Phoenicopterus minor

Buttonquail

Order: CharadriiformesFamily: Turnicidae

The buttonquail are small, drab, running birds which resemble the true quails. The female is the brighter of the sexes and initiates courtship. The male incubates the eggs and tends the young.

Common buttonquail, Turnix sylvaticus
Yellow-legged buttonquail, Turnix tanki
Barred buttonquail, Turnix suscitator

Stone-curlews and thick-knees

Order: CharadriiformesFamily: Burhinidae

The thick-knees are a group of largely tropical waders in the family Burhinidae. They are found worldwide within the tropical zone, with some species also breeding in temperate Europe and Australia. They are medium to large waders with strong black or yellow-black bills, large yellow eyes and cryptic plumage. Despite being classed as waders, most species have a preference for arid or semi-arid habitats.

Indian stone-curlew, Burhinus indicus
Great stone-curlew, Esacus recurvirostris

Oystercatchers
Order: CharadriiformesFamily: Haematopodidae

The oystercatchers are large and noisy plover-like birds, with strong bills used for smashing or prising open molluscs.

Eurasian oystercatcher, Haematopus ostralegus

Stilts and avocets

Order: CharadriiformesFamily: Recurvirostridae

Recurvirostridae is a family of large wading birds, which includes the avocets and stilts. The avocets have long legs and long up-curved bills. The stilts have extremely long legs and long, thin, straight bills.

Black-winged stilt, Himantopus himantopus
Pied avocet, Recurvirostra avosetta

Plovers

Order: CharadriiformesFamily: Charadriidae

The family Charadriidae includes the plovers, dotterels and lapwings. They are small to medium-sized birds with compact bodies, short, thick necks and long, usually pointed, wings. They are found in open country worldwide, mostly in habitats near water.

River lapwing, Vanellus duvaucelii
Yellow-wattled lapwing, Vanellus malabaricus
Grey-headed lapwing, Vanellus cinereus
Red-wattled lapwing, Vanellus indicus
Sociable lapwing, Vanellus gregarius
European golden plover, Pluvialis apricaria
Pacific golden plover, Pluvialis fulva
Grey plover, Pluvialis squatarola
Common ringed plover, Charadrius hiaticula
Little ringed plover, Charadrius dubius
Kentish plover, Charadrius alexandrinus
Lesser sand plover, Charadrius mongolus
Greater sand plover, Charadrius leschenaultii
Caspian plover, Charadrius asiaticus

Painted-snipes
Order: CharadriiformesFamily: Rostratulidae

Painted-snipes are short-legged, long-billed birds similar in shape to the true snipes, but more brightly coloured.

Greater painted-snipe, Rostratula benghalensis

Jacanas
Order: CharadriiformesFamily: Jacanidae

The jacanas are a group of tropical waders in the family Jacanidae. They are found throughout the tropics. They are identifiable by their huge feet and claws which enable them to walk on floating vegetation in the shallow lakes that are their preferred habitat.

Pheasant-tailed jacana, Hydrophasianus chirurgus
Bronze-winged jacana, Metopidius indicus

Sandpipers and snipes

Order: CharadriiformesFamily: Scolopacidae

Scolopacidae is a large diverse family of small to medium-sized shorebirds including the sandpipers, curlews, godwits, shanks, tattlers, woodcocks, snipes, dowitchers and phalaropes. The majority of these species eat small invertebrates picked out of the mud or soil. Variation in length of legs and bills enables multiple species to feed in the same habitat, particularly on the coast, without direct competition for food.

Eurasian whimbrel, Numenius phaeopus
Eurasian curlew, Numenius arquata
Bar-tailed godwit, Limosa lapponica
Black-tailed godwit, Limosa limosa
Ruddy turnstone, Arenaria interpres
Great knot, Calidris tenuirostris
Red knot, Calidris canutus (A)
Ruff, Calidris pugnax
Broad-billed sandpiper, Calidris falcinellus
Curlew sandpiper, Calidris ferruginea
Temminck's stint, Calidris temminckii
Long-toed stint, Calidris subminuta
Spoon-billed sandpiper, Calidris pygmaea (A)
Sanderling, Calidris alba
Dunlin, Calidris alpina
Little stint, Calidris minuta
Asian dowitcher, Limnodromus semipalmatus
Eurasian woodcock, Scolopax rusticola
Jack snipe, Lymnocryptes minimus
Wood snipe, Gallinago nemoricola
Pin-tailed snipe, Gallinago stenura
Swinhoe's snipe, Gallinago megala
Common snipe, Gallinago gallinago
Terek sandpiper, Xenus cinereus
Red-necked phalarope, Phalaropus lobatus
Common sandpiper, Actitis hypoleucos
Green sandpiper, Tringa ochropus
Common redshank, Tringa totanus
Marsh sandpiper, Tringa stagnatilis
Wood sandpiper, Tringa glareola
Spotted redshank, Tringa erythropus
Common greenshank, Tringa nebularia

Coursers and pratincoles
Order: CharadriiformesFamily: Glareolidae

Glareolidae is a family of wading birds comprising the pratincoles, which have short legs, long, pointed wings and long, forked tails, and the coursers, which have long legs, short wings and long, pointed bills which curve downwards.

Indian courser, Cursorius coromandelicus
Jerdon's courser, Rhinoptilus bitorquatus
Collared pratincole, Glareola pratincola
Oriental pratincole, Glareola maldivarum
Small pratincole, Glareola lactea

Gulls, terns, and skimmers

Order: CharadriiformesFamily: Laridae

Laridae is a family of medium to large seabirds, the gulls, terns, and skimmers. Gulls are typically grey or white, often with black markings on the head or wings. They have stout, longish bills and webbed feet. Terns are a group of generally medium to large seabirds typically with grey or white plumage, often with black markings on the head. Most terns hunt fish by diving but some pick insects off the surface of fresh water. Terns are generally long-lived birds, with several species known to live in excess of 30 years.

Brown noddy, Anous stolidus
Lesser noddy, Anous tenuirostris
Indian skimmer, Rynchops albicollis
Slender-billed gull, Chroicocephalus genei
Brown-headed gull, Chroicocephalus brunnicephalus
Black-headed gull, Chroicocephalus ridibundus
Pallas's gull, Ichthyaetus ichthyaetus
Lesser black-backed gull, Larus fuscus
Gull-billed tern, Gelochelidon nilotica
Caspian tern, Hydroprogne caspia
Greater crested tern, Thalasseus bergii
Lesser crested tern, Thalasseus bengalensis
Sandwich tern, Thalasseus sandvicensis
Little tern, Sternula albifrons
Bridled tern, Onychoprion anaethetus
Sooty tern, Onychoprion fuscatus
River tern, Sterna aurantia
Common tern, Sterna hirundo
Black-bellied tern, Sterna acuticauda
Whiskered tern, Chlidonias hybrida
White-winged tern, Chlidonias leucopterus

Storks

Order: CiconiiformesFamily: Ciconiidae

Storks are large, long-legged, long-necked, wading birds with long, stout bills. Storks are mute, but bill-clattering is an important mode of communication at the nest. Their nests can be large and may be reused for many years. Many species are migratory.

Painted stork, Mycteria leucocephala
Asian openbill, Anastomus oscitans
Black stork, Ciconia nigra
Woolly-necked stork, Ciconia episcopus
White stork, Ciconia ciconia
Black-necked stork, Ephippiorhynchus asiaticus
Lesser adjutant, Leptoptilos javanicus (A)

Anhingas and darters

Order: SuliformesFamily: Anhingidae

Darters are often called "snake-birds" because of their long thin neck, which gives a snake-like appearance when they swim with their bodies submerged. The males have black and dark-brown plumage, an erectile crest on the nape and a larger bill than the female. The females have much paler plumage especially on the neck and underparts. The darters have completely webbed feet and their legs are short and set far back on the body. Their plumage is somewhat permeable, like that of cormorants, and they spread their wings to dry after diving.

Oriental darter, Anhinga melanogaster

Cormorants and shags

Order: SuliformesFamily: Phalacrocoracidae

Phalacrocoracidae is a family of medium to large coastal, fish-eating seabirds that includes cormorants and shags. Plumage colouration varies, with the majority having mainly dark plumage, some species being black-and-white and a few being colourful.

Little cormorant, Microcarbo niger
Indian cormorant, Phalacrocorax fuscicollis
Great cormorant, Phalacrocorax carbo

Ibises and spoonbills

Order: PelecaniformesFamily: Threskiornithidae

Threskiornithidae is a family of large terrestrial and wading birds which includes the ibises and spoonbills. They have long, broad wings with 11 primary and about 20 secondary feathers. They are strong fliers and despite their size and weight, very capable soarers.

Black-headed ibis, Threskiornis melanocephalus
Red-naped ibis, Pseudibis papillosa
Glossy ibis, Plegadis falcinellus
Eurasian spoonbill, Platalea leucorodia

Herons and bitterns

Order: PelecaniformesFamily: Ardeidae

The family Ardeidae contains the bitterns, herons and egrets. Herons and egrets are medium to large wading birds with long necks and legs. Bitterns tend to be shorter-necked and more wary. Members of Ardeidae fly with their necks retracted, unlike other long-necked birds such as storks, ibises and spoonbills.

Eurasian bittern, Botaurus stellaris
Yellow bittern, Ixobrychus sinensis
Cinnamon bittern, Ixobrychus cinnamomeus
Black bittern, Ixobrychus flavicollis
Black-crowned night heron, Nycticorax nycticorax
Striated heron, Butorides striata
Indian pond heron, Ardeola grayii
Eastern cattle egret, Bubulcus coromandus
Grey heron, Ardea cinerea
Purple heron, Ardea purpurea
Great egret, Ardea alba
Intermediate egret, Ardea intermedia
Little egret, Egretta garzetta
Western reef heron, Egretta gularis
Pacific reef heron, Egretta sacra

Pelicans

Order: PelecaniformesFamily: Pelecanidae

Pelicans are large water birds with a distinctive pouch under their beak. As with other members of the order Pelecaniformes, they have webbed feet with four toes.

Great white pelican, Pelecanus onocrotalus
Spot-billed pelican, Pelecanus philippensis

Osprey

Order: AccipitriformesFamily: Pandionidae

The family Pandionidae contains usually only one species, the osprey. The osprey is a medium-large raptor which is a specialist fish-eater.

Osprey, Pandion haliaetus

Kites, hawks, and eagles

Order: AccipitriformesFamily: Accipitridae

Accipitridae is a family of birds of prey, which includes hawks, eagles, kites, harriers and Old World vultures. These birds have powerful hooked beaks for tearing flesh from their prey, strong legs, powerful talons and keen eyesight.

Black-winged kite, Elanus caeruleus
Egyptian vulture, Neophron percnopterus
Crested honey buzzard, Pernis ptilorhynchus
Jerdon's baza, Aviceda jerdoniWhite-rumped vulture, Gyps bengalensis
Indian vulture, Gyps indicus
Griffon vulture, Gyps fulvus
Red-headed vulture, Sarcogyps calvus
Crested serpent eagle, Spilornis cheela
Short-toed snake eagle, Circaetus gallicus
Changeable hawk-eagle, Nisaetus cirrhatus
Rufous-bellied eagle, Lophotriorchis kienerii
Black eagle, Ictinaetus malaiensis
Indian spotted eagle, Clanga hastata
Greater spotted eagle, Clanga clanga
Booted eagle, Hieraaetus pennatus
Tawny eagle, Aquila rapax
Steppe eagle, Aquila nipalensis
Eastern imperial eagle, Aquila heliaca
Bonelli's eagle, Aquila fasciata
Crested goshawk, Accipiter trivirgatus
Shikra, Accipiter badius
Besra, Accipiter virgatus
Eurasian sparrowhawk, Accipiter nisus
Western marsh harrier, Circus aeruginosus
Hen harrier, Circus cyaneus
Pallid harrier, Circus macrourus
Pied harrier, Circus melanoleucos
Montagu's harrier, Circus pygargus
Black kite, Milvus migrans
Brahminy kite, Haliastur indus
White-bellied sea eagle, Haliaeetus leucogaster
Grey-headed fish eagle, Haliaeetus ichthyaetus
White-eyed buzzard, Butastur teesa
Long-legged buzzard, Buteo rufinus

Barn owlsOrder: StrigiformesFamily: Tytonidae

Barn owls are medium to large owls with large heads and characteristic heart-shaped faces. They have long strong legs with powerful talons.

Eastern barn owl, Tyto javanica 
Eastern grass owl, Tyto longimembris

OwlsOrder: StrigiformesFamily: Strigidae

The typical owls are small to large solitary nocturnal birds of prey. They have large forward-facing eyes and ears, a hawk-like beak and a conspicuous circle of feathers around each eye called a facial disk.

Indian scops owl, Otus bakkamoena
Eurasian scops owl, Otus scops
Oriental scops owl, Otus sunia
Eurasian eagle-owl, Bubo bubo
Indian eagle-owl, Bubo bengalensis
Spot-bellied eagle-owl, Bubo nipalensis
Dusky eagle-owl, Bubo coromandus
Brown fish owl, Ketupa zeylonensis
Mottled wood owl, Strix ocellata
Brown wood owl, Strix leptogrammica
Jungle owlet, Glaucidium radiatum
Spotted owlet, Athene brama
Brown boobook, Ninox scutulata
Short-eared owl, Asio flammeus

TrogonsOrder: TrogoniformesFamily: Trogonidae

The family Trogonidae includes trogons and quetzals. Found in tropical woodlands worldwide, they feed on insects and fruit, and their broad bills and weak legs reflect their diet and arboreal habits. Although their flight is fast, they are reluctant to fly any distance. Trogons have soft, often colourful, feathers with distinctive male and female plumage.

Malabar trogon, Harpactes fasciatus

HoopoesOrder: BucerotiformesFamily: Upupidae

Hoopoes have black, white and orangey-pink colouring with a large erectile crest on their head.

Eurasian hoopoe, Upupa epops

HornbillsOrder: BucerotiformesFamily: Bucerotidae

Hornbills are a group of birds whose bill is shaped like a cow's horn, but without a twist, sometimes with a casque on the upper mandible. Frequently, the bill is brightly coloured.

Oriental pied hornbill, Anthracoceros albirostris
Malabar pied hornbill, Anthracoceros coronatus
Indian grey hornbill, Ocyceros birostris

RollersOrder: CoraciiformesFamily: Coraciidae

Rollers resemble crows in size and build, but are more closely related to the kingfishers and bee-eaters. They share the colourful appearance of those groups with blues and browns predominating. The two inner front toes are connected, but the outer toe is not.

Indian roller, Coracias benghalensis
Indochinese roller, Coracias affinis
European roller, Coracias garrulus
Oriental dollarbird, Eurystomus orientalis

KingfishersOrder: CoraciiformesFamily: Alcedinidae

Kingfishers are medium-sized birds with large heads, long, pointed bills, short legs and stubby tails.

Stork-billed kingfisher, Pelargopsis capensis
White-throated kingfisher, Halcyon smyrnensis
Black-capped kingfisher, Halcyon pileata
Blue-eared kingfisher, Alcedo meninting
Common kingfisher, Alcedo atthis
Pied kingfisher, Ceryle rudis

Bee-eatersOrder: CoraciiformesFamily: Meropidae

The bee-eaters are a group of near passerine birds in the family Meropidae. Most species are found in Africa but others occur in southern Europe, Madagascar, Australia and New Guinea. They are characterised by richly coloured plumage, slender bodies and usually elongated central tail feathers. All are colourful and have long downturned bills and pointed wings, which give them a swallow-like appearance when seen from afar.

Blue-bearded bee-eater, Nyctyornis athertoni
Asian green bee-eater, Merops orientalis
Blue-tailed bee-eater, Merops philippinus
Chestnut-headed bee-eater, Merops leschenaulti
European bee-eater, Merops apiaster

Asian barbetsOrder: PiciformesFamily: Megalaimidae

The Asian barbets are plump birds, with short necks and large heads. They get their name from the bristles which fringe their heavy bills. Most species are brightly coloured.

Brown-headed barbet, Psilopogon zeylanicus
Lineated barbet, Psilopogon lineatus
White-cheeked barbet, Psilopogon viridis
Coppersmith barbet, Psilopogon haemacephalus

WoodpeckersOrder: PiciformesFamily: Picidae

Woodpeckers are small to medium-sized birds with chisel-like beaks, short legs, stiff tails and long tongues used for capturing insects. Some species have feet with two toes pointing forward and two backward, while several species have only three toes. Many woodpeckers have the habit of tapping noisily on tree trunks with their beaks.

Eurasian wryneck, Jynx torquilla
Speckled piculet, Picumnus innominatus
Heart-spotted woodpecker, Hemicircus canente
Brown-capped pygmy woodpecker, Yungipicus nanus
Yellow-crowned woodpecker, Leiopicus mahrattensis
Fulvous-breasted woodpecker, Dendrocopos macei
White-bellied woodpecker, Dryocopus javensis
Greater yellownape, Chrysophlegma flavinucha
Lesser yellownape, Picus chlorolophus
Streak-throated woodpecker, Picus xanthopygaeus
Grey-headed woodpecker, Picus canus
Himalayan flameback, Dinopium shorii
Common flameback, Dinopium javanense
Black-rumped flameback, Dinopium benghalense
Greater flameback, Chrysocolaptes guttacristatus
White-naped woodpecker, Chrysocolaptes festivus
Rufous woodpecker, Micropternus brachyurus

Caracaras and falconsOrder: FalconiformesFamily: Falconidae

Falconidae is a family of diurnal birds of prey. They differ from hawks, eagles and kites in that they kill with their beaks instead of their talons.

Lesser kestrel, Falco naumanni
Common kestrel, Falco tinnunculus
Red-necked falcon, Falco chiquera
Amur falcon, Falco amurensis
Eurasian hobby, Falco subbuteo
Laggar falcon, Falco jugger
Peregrine falcon, Falco peregrinus

Old World parrotsOrder: PsittaciformesFamily: Psittaculidae

Characteristic features of parrots include a strong curved bill, an upright stance, strong legs, and clawed zygodactyl feet. Many parrots are vividly coloured, and some are multi-coloured. Old World parrots are found from Africa east across south and southeast Asia and Oceania to Australia and New Zealand.

Blossom-headed parakeet, Psittacula roseata
Plum-headed parakeet, Psittacula cyanocephala
Blue-winged parakeet, Psittacula columboides
Alexandrine parakeet, Psittacula eupatria
Rose-ringed parakeet, Psittacula krameri
Vernal hanging parrot, Loriculus vernalis

PittasOrder: PasseriformesFamily: Pittidae

Pittas are medium-sized by passerine standards and are stocky, with fairly long, strong legs, short tails and stout bills. Many are brightly coloured. They spend the majority of their time on wet forest floors, eating snails, insects and similar invertebrates.

Indian pitta, Pitta brachyura
Mangrove pitta, Pitta megarhyncha (A)

Vangas, helmetshrikes, woodshrikes, and shrike-flycatchersOrder: PasseriformesFamily: Vangidae

The woodshrikes are similar in build to the shrikes.

Bar-winged flycatcher-shrike, Hemipus picatus
Large woodshrike, Tephrodornis gularis
Common woodshrike, Tephrodornis pondicerianus

Woodswallows, butcherbirds, and peltopsOrder: PasseriformesFamily: Artamidae

The woodswallows are soft-plumaged, somber-coloured passerine birds. They are smooth, agile flyers with moderately large, semi-triangular wings.

Ashy woodswallow, Artamus fuscus

IorasOrder: PasseriformesFamily''': Aegithinidae

The ioras are bulbul-like birds of open forest or thorn scrub, but whereas that group tends to be drab in colouration, ioras are sexually dimorphic, with the males being brightly plumaged in yellows and greens.

Common iora, Aegithina tiphiaMarshall's iora, Aegithina nigroluteaCuckooshrikesOrder: PasseriformesFamily: Campephagidae

The cuckooshrikes are small to medium-sized passerine birds. They are predominantly greyish with white and black, although some species are brightly coloured.

White-bellied minivet, Pericrocotus erythropygius
Small minivet, Pericrocotus cinnamomeus
Long-tailed minivet, Pericrocotus ethologus
Orange minivet, Pericrocotus flammeus
Scarlet minivet, Pericrocotus speciosus
Ashy minivet, Pericrocotus divaricatus
Rosy minivet, Pericrocotus roseus
Large cuckooshrike, Coracina macei
Black-winged cuckooshrike, Lalage melaschistos
Black-headed cuckooshrike, Lalage melanoptera

ShrikesOrder: PasseriformesFamily: Laniidae

Shrikes are passerine birds known for their habit of catching other birds and small animals and impaling the uneaten portions of their bodies on thorns. A typical shrike's beak is hooked, like a bird of prey.

Brown shrike, Lanius cristatus 
Isabelline shrike, Lanius isabellinus
Bay-backed shrike, Lanius vittatus
Long-tailed shrike, Lanius schach
Grey-backed shrike, Lanius tephronotus
Great grey shrike, Lanius excubitor

Figbirds, orioles, and turnagraOrder: PasseriformesFamily: Oriolidae

The Old World orioles are colourful passerine birds. They are not related to the New World orioles.

Black-hooded oriole, Oriolus xanthornus
Indian golden oriole, Oriolus kundoo)
Black-naped oriole, Oriolus chinensis
Slender-billed oriole, Oriolus tenuirostris

DrongosOrder: PasseriformesFamily: Dicruridae

The drongos are mostly black or dark grey in colour, sometimes with metallic tints. They have long forked tails, and some Asian species have elaborate tail decorations. They have short legs and sit very upright when perched, like a shrike. They flycatch or take prey from the ground.

Bronzed drongo, Dicrurus aeneus
Greater racket-tailed drongo, Dicrurus paradiseus
Hair-crested drongo, Dicrurus hottentottus
Ashy drongo, Dicrurus leucophaeus
White-bellied drongo, Dicrurus caerulescens
Black drongo, Dicrurus macrocercus

Fantails and silktailsOrder: PasseriformesFamily: Rhipiduridae

The fantails are small insectivorous birds which are specialist aerial feeders.

White-throated fantail, Rhipidura albicollis
White-spotted fantail, Rhipidura albogularis
White-browed fantail, Rhipidura aureola

MonarchsOrder: PasseriformesFamily: Monarchidae

The monarchs are small to medium-sized insectivorous passerines which hunt by flycatching.

Black-naped monarch, Hypothymis azurea
Indian paradise flycatcher, Terpsiphone paradisi

Crows and jaysOrder: PasseriformesFamily: Corvidae

The family Corvidae includes crows, ravens, jays, choughs, magpies, treepies, nutcrackers and ground jays. Corvids are above average in size among the Passeriformes, and some of the larger species show high levels of intelligence.

Rufous treepie, Dendrocitta vagabunda
Grey treepie, Dendrocitta formosae
House crow, Corvus splendens
Large-billed crow, Corvus macrorhynchos
Indian jungle crow, Corvus culminatus

Fairy flycatchersOrder: PasseriformesFamily: Stenostiridae

Most of the species of this small family are found in Africa, though a few inhabit tropical Asia. They are not closely related to other birds called "flycatchers".

Grey-headed canary-flycatcher, Culicicapa ceylonensis

Tits and chickadeesOrder: PasseriformesFamily: Paridae

The Paridae are mainly small stocky woodland species with short stout bills. Some have crests. They are adaptable birds, with a mixed diet including seeds and insects.

Cinereous tit, Parus cinereus
White-naped tit, Machlolophus nuchalis (A)
Himalayan black-lored tit, Machlolophus xanthogenys
Indian black-lored tit, Machlolophus aplonotus 
Yellow-cheeked tit, Machlolophus spilonotus

LarksOrder: PasseriformesFamily: Alaudidae

Larks are small terrestrial birds with often extravagant songs and display flights. Most larks are fairly dull in appearance. Their food is insects and seeds.

Rufous-tailed lark, Ammomanes phoenicura
Ashy-crowned sparrow-lark, Eremopterix griseus
Singing bush lark, Mirafra cantillans
Bengal bush lark, Mirafra assamica
Indian bush lark, Mirafra erythroptera
Jerdon's bush lark, Mirafra affinis
Oriental skylark, Alauda gulgula
Eurasian skylark, Alauda arvensis
Sykes's lark, Galerida deva
Crested lark, Galerida cristata
Mongolian short-toed lark, Calandrella dukhunensis
Greater short-toed lark, Calandrella brachydactyla
Turkestan short-toed lark, Alaudala heinei

BulbulsOrder: PasseriformesFamily: Pycnonotidae

Bulbuls are medium-sized songbirds. Some are colourful with yellow, red or orange vents, cheeks, throats or supercilia, but most are drab, with uniform olive-brown to black plumage. Some species have distinct crests.

White-throated bulbul, Alophoixus flaveolus
Yellow-browed bulbul, Acritillas indica
Black-crested bulbul, Rubigula flaviventris
Flame-throated bulbul, Rubigula gularis
White-browed bulbul, Pycnonotus luteolus
Yellow-throated bulbul, Pycnonotus xantholaemus
Red-whiskered bulbul, Pycnonotus jocosus
Red-vented bulbul, Pycnonotus cafer
Himalayan bulbul, Pycnonotus leucogenys

Swallows and martinsOrder: PasseriformesFamily: Hirundinidae

The family Hirundinidae is adapted to aerial feeding. They have a slender streamlined body, long pointed wings and a short bill with a wide gape. The feet are adapted to perching rather than walking, and the front toes are partially joined at the base.

Grey-throated martin, Riparia chinensis
Sand martin, Riparia riparia
Pale martin, Riparia diluta
Barn swallow, Hirundo rustica
Wire-tailed swallow, Hirundo smithii
Dusky crag martin, Ptyonoprogne concolor
Common house martin, Delichon urbicum
Asian house martin, Delichon dasypus
Red-rumped swallow, Cecropis daurica
Striated swallow, Cecropis striolata
Streak-throated swallow, Petrochelidon fluvicola

Cettia bush warblers and alliesOrder: PasseriformesFamily: Cettiidae

Cettiidae is a family of small insectivorous songbirds. It contains the typical bush warblers (Cettia) and their relatives. Its members occur mainly in Asia and Africa, ranging into Oceania and Europe.

Pale-footed bush warbler, Urosphena pallidipes

Leaf warblers and alliesOrder: PasseriformesFamily: Phylloscopidae

Leaf warblers are a family of small insectivorous birds found mostly in Eurasia and ranging into Wallacea and Africa. The species are of various sizes, often green-plumaged above and yellow below, or more subdued with grayish-green to grayish-brown colors.

Hume's leaf warbler, Phylloscopus humei
Yellow-browed warbler, Phylloscopus inornatus
Tytler's leaf warbler, Phylloscopus tytleri
Sulphur-bellied warbler, Phylloscopus griseolus
Tickell's leaf warbler, Phylloscopus affinis
Mountain chiffchaff, Phylloscopus sindianus
Common chiffchaff, Phylloscopus collybita
Green-crowned warbler, Phylloscopus burkii
Green warbler, Phylloscopus nitidus
Greenish warbler, Phylloscopus trochiloides
Large-billed leaf warbler, Phylloscopus magnirostris
Western crowned warbler, Phylloscopus occipitalis

Reed warblers, Grauer's warbler, and alliesOrder: PasseriformesFamily: Acrocephalidae

The members of this family are usually rather large for "warblers". Most are rather plain olivaceous brown above with much yellow to beige below. They are usually found in open woodland, reedbeds, or tall grass. The family occurs mostly in southern to western Eurasia and surroundings, but it also ranges far into the Pacific, with some species in Africa.

Clamorous reed warbler, Acrocephalus stentoreus
Paddyfield warbler, Acrocephalus agricola
Blyth's reed warbler, Acrocephalus dumetorum
Thick-billed warbler, Arundinax aedon
Booted warbler, Iduna caligata
Sykes's warbler, Iduna rama

Grassbirds and alliesOrder: PasseriformesFamily: Locustellidae

Locustellidae are a family of small insectivorous songbirds found mainly in Eurasia, Africa, and the Australian region. They are smallish birds with tails that are usually long and pointed, and tend to be drab brownish or buffy all over.

Pallas's grasshopper warbler, Helopsaltes certhiola
Common grasshopper warbler, Locustella naevia
Bristled grassbird, Schoenicola striatus

Cisticolas and alliesOrder: PasseriformesFamily: Cisticolidae

The Cisticolidae are warblers found mainly in warmer southern regions of the Old World. They are generally very small birds of drab brown or grey appearance found in open country such as grassland or scrub.

Zitting cisticola, Cisticola juncidis
Golden-headed cisticola, Cisticola exilis
Rufous-fronted prinia, Prinia buchanani
Rufescent prinia, Prinia rufescens
Grey-breasted prinia, Prinia hodgsonii
Jungle prinia, Prinia sylvatica
Ashy prinia, Prinia socialis
Plain prinia, Prinia inornata
Common tailorbird, Orthotomus sutorius

Sylviid babblersOrder: PasseriformesFamily: Sylviidae

The family Sylviidae is a group of small insectivorous passerine birds. They mainly occur as breeding species, as the common name implies, in Europe, Asia and, to a lesser extent, Africa. Most are of generally undistinguished appearance, but many have distinctive songs.

Lesser whitethroat, Curruca curruca
Hume's whitethroat, Curruca althaea
Eastern Orphean warbler, Curruca crassirostris

Parrotbills and alliesOrder: PasseriformesFamily: Paradoxornithidae

The parrotbills are a group of peculiar birds native to East and Southeast Asia, though feral populations exist elsewhere. They are generally small, long-tailed birds which inhabit reedbeds and similar habitat. They feed mainly on seeds, e.g. of grasses, to which their bill, as the name implies, is well-adapted.

Yellow-eyed babbler, Chrysomma sinense

White-eyesOrder: PasseriformesFamily: Zosteropidae

The white-eyes are small and mostly undistinguished, their plumage above being generally some dull colour like greenish-olive, but some species have a white or bright yellow throat, breast or lower parts, and several have buff flanks. As their name suggests, many species have a white ring around each eye.

Indian white-eye, Zosterops palpebrosus

Babblers and scimitar babblersOrder: PasseriformesFamily: Timaliidae

The babblers, or timaliids, are somewhat diverse in size and colouration, but are characterised by soft fluffy plumage.

Tawny-bellied babbler, Dumetia hyperythra
Pin-striped tit-babbler, Mixornis gularis
Buff-chested babbler, Cyanoderma ambiguum
White-browed scimitar babbler, Pomatorhinus schisticeps
Indian scimitar babbler, Pomatorhinus horsfieldii

Ground babblersOrder: PasseriformesFamily: Pellorneidae

These small to medium-sized songbirds have soft fluffy plumage but are otherwise rather diverse. Members of the genus Illadopsis are found in forests, but some other genera are birds of scrublands.

Puff-throated babbler, Pellorneum ruficeps
Abbott's babbler, Malacocincla abbotti

Alcippe fulvettasOrder: PasseriformesFamily: Alcippeidae

The genus once included many other fulvettas and was previously placed in families Pellorneidae or Timaliidae.

Brown-cheeked fulvetta, Alcippe poioicephala

Laughingthrushes and alliesOrder: PasseriformesFamily: Leiothrichidae

The members of this family are diverse in size and colouration, though those of genus Turdoides tend to be brown or greyish. The family is found in Africa, India, and southeast Asia.

Large grey babbler, Argya malcolmi
Rufous babbler, Argya subrufa
Jungle babbler, Argya striata
Yellow-billed babbler, Argya affinis
Common babbler, Argya caudata

Fairy-bluebirdsOrder: PasseriformesFamily: Irenidae

The fairy-bluebirds are bulbul-like birds of open forest or thorn scrub. The males are dark-blue and the females a duller green.

Asian fairy-bluebird, Irena puella

NuthatchesOrder: PasseriformesFamily: Sittidae

Nuthatches are small woodland birds. They have the unusual ability to climb down trees head first, unlike other birds which can only go upwards. Nuthatches have big heads, short tails and powerful bills and feet.

Velvet-fronted nuthatch, Sitta frontalis
Indian nuthatch, Sitta castanea

TreecreepersOrder: PasseriformesFamily: Certhiidae

Treecreepers are small woodland birds, brown above and white below. They have thin pointed down-curved bills, which they use to extricate insects from bark. They have stiff tail feathers, like woodpeckers, which they use to support themselves on vertical trees.

Indian spotted creeper, Salpornis spilonota

Starlings and rhabdornisOrder: PasseriformesFamily: Sturnidae

Starlings are small to medium-sized passerine birds. Their flight is strong and direct and they are very gregarious. Their preferred habitat is fairly open country. They eat insects and fruit. Plumage is typically dark with a metallic sheen.

Common hill myna, Gracula religiosa
Southern hill myna, Gracula indica
Jungle myna, Acridotheres fuscus
Bank myna, Acridotheres ginginianus
Common myna, Acridotheres tristis
Pied myna, Gracupica contra
Daurian starling, Agropsar sturninus
Chestnut-tailed starling, Sturnia malabarica
Brahminy starling, Sturnia pagodarum
Rosy starling, Pastor roseus
Common starling, Sturnus vulgaris

ThrushesOrder: PasseriformesFamily: Turdidae

The thrushes are a group of passerine birds that occur mainly in the Old World. They are plump, soft plumaged, small to medium-sized insectivores or sometimes omnivores, often feeding on the ground. Many have attractive songs.

Pied thrush, Geokichla wardii
Orange-headed thrush, Geokichla citrina
Tickell's thrush, Turdus unicolor
Indian blackbird, Turdus simillimus 
Black-throated thrush, Turdus atrogularis

Old World flycatchersOrder: PasseriformesFamily: Muscicapidae

Old World flycatchers are a large group of small passerine birds native to the Old World. They are mainly small arboreal insectivores. The appearance of these birds is highly varied, but they mostly have weak songs and harsh calls.

Indian robin, Copsychus fulicatus
Oriental magpie-robin, Copsychus saularis
White-rumped shama, Copsychus malabaricus
Dark-sided flycatcher, Muscicapa sibirica
Asian brown flycatcher, Muscicapa dauurica
Brown-breasted flycatcher, Muscicapa muttui
Pale-chinned blue flycatcher, Cyornis tickelliae
Tickell's blue flycatcher, Cyornis tickelliae
Blue-throated blue flycatcher, Cyornis rubeculoides
Verditer flycatcher, Eumyias thalassinus
Nilgiri flycatcher, Eumyias albicaudatus
Indian blue robin, Larvivora brunnea
Bluethroat, Luscinia svecica
Siberian rubythroat, Calliope calliope 
Malabar whistling thrush, Myophonus horsfieldii
Ultramarine flycatcher, Ficedula superciliaris
Little pied flycatcher, Ficedula westermanni
Rusty-tailed flycatcher, Ficedula ruficauda
Taiga flycatcher, Ficedula albicilla
Red-breasted flycatcher, Ficedula parva
Black redstart, Phoenicurus ochruros
Blue rock thrush, Monticola solitarius
Blue-capped rock thrush, Monticola cinclorhyncha
Siberian stonechat, Saxicola maurus 
Pied bush chat, Saxicola caprata
Grey bush chat, Saxicola ferreus
Isabelline wheatear, Oenanthe isabellina

LeafbirdsOrder: PasseriformesFamily: Chloropseidae

The leafbirds are small, bulbul-like birds. The males are brightly plumaged, usually in greens and yellows.

Jerdon's leafbird, Chloropsis jerdoni 
Golden-fronted leafbird, Chloropsis aurifrons

FlowerpeckersOrder: PasseriformesFamily: Dicaeidae

The flowerpeckers are very small, stout, often brightly coloured birds, with short tails, short thick curved bills and tubular tongues.

Thick-billed flowerpecker, Dicaeum agile
Pale-billed flowerpecker, Dicaeum erythrorhynchos
Nilgiri flowerpecker, Dicaeum concolor

SunbirdsOrder: PasseriformesFamily: Nectariniidae

The sunbirds and spiderhunters are very small passerine birds which feed largely on nectar, although they will also take insects, especially when feeding young. Flight is fast and direct on their short wings. Most species can take nectar by hovering like a hummingbird, but usually perch to feed.

Ruby-cheeked sunbird, Chalcoparia singalensis
Purple-rumped sunbird, Leptocoma zeylonica
Purple sunbird, Cinnyris asiaticus
Loten's sunbird, Cinnyris lotenius
Crimson sunbird, Aethopyga siparaja
Little spiderhunter, Arachnothera longirostra

Old World sparrows and snowfinchesOrder: PasseriformesFamily: Passeridae

Old World sparrows are small passerine birds. In general, sparrows tend to be small, plump, brown or grey birds with short tails and short powerful beaks. Sparrows are seed eaters, but they also consume small insects.

House sparrow, Passer domesticus
Eurasian tree sparrow, Passer montanus
Yellow-throated sparrow, Gymnoris xanthocollis

Weavers and widowbirdsOrder: PasseriformesFamily: Ploceidae

The weavers are small passerine birds related to the finches. They are seed-eating birds with rounded conical bills. The males of many species are brightly coloured, usually in red or yellow and black, some species show variation in colour only in the breeding season.

Black-breasted weaver, Ploceus benghalensis
Streaked weaver, Ploceus manyar
Baya weaver, Ploceus philippinus

Waxbills, munias, and alliesOrder: PasseriformesFamily: Estrildidae

The estrildid finches are small passerine birds of the Old World tropics and Australasia. They are gregarious and often colonial seed eaters with short thick but pointed bills. They are all similar in structure and habits, but have wide variation in plumage colours and patterns.

Indian silverbill, Euodice malabarica
Scaly-breasted munia, Lonchura punctulata
Black-throated munia, Lonchura kelaarti
White-rumped munia, Lonchura striata
Tricolored munia, Lonchura malacca
Green avadavat, Amandava formosa
Red avadavat, Amandava amandava

Wagtails and pipitsOrder: PasseriformesFamily: Motacillidae

Motacillidae is a family of small passerine birds with medium to long tails. They include the wagtails, longclaws and pipits. They are slender, ground feeding insectivores of open country.

Forest wagtail, Dendronanthus indicus
Western yellow wagtail, Motacilla flava
Citrine wagtail, Motacilla citreola
Grey wagtail, Motacilla cinerea
White wagtail, Motacilla alba
White-browed wagtail, Motacilla maderaspatensis
Richard's pipit, Anthus richardi
Paddyfield pipit, Anthus rufulus 
Blyth's pipit, Anthus godlewskii
Tawny pipit, Anthus campestris
Long-billed pipit, Anthus similis
Tree pipit, Anthus trivialis
Olive-backed pipit, Anthus hodgsoni

Finches and euphoniasOrder: PasseriformesFamily: Fringillidae

Finches are seed-eating passerine birds, that are small to moderately large and have a strong beak, usually conical and in some species very large. All have twelve tail feathers and nine primaries. These birds have a bouncing flight with alternating bouts of flapping and gliding on closed wings, and most sing well.

Common rosefinch, Carpodacus erythrinus

BuntingsOrder: PasseriformesFamily': Emberizidae

The emberizids are a large family of passerine birds. They are seed-eating birds with distinctively shaped bills. In Europe, most species are called buntings. In North America, most of the species in this family are known as sparrows, but these birds are not closely related to the Old World sparrows which are in the family Passeridae. Many emberizid species have distinctive head patterns.

Crested bunting, Emberiza lathamiGrey-necked bunting, Emberiza buchananiBlack-headed bunting, Emberiza melanocephalaRed-headed bunting, Emberiza bruniceps''

See also 
 Lists of birds by region

References

Andhra Pradesh-related lists
Andhra Pradesh